Helicodiscus parallelus, common name the compound coil, is a species of small air-breathing land snail, a terrestrial pulmonate gastropod mollusk in the family Helicodiscidae.

Helicodiscus parallelus is the type species of the genus Helicodiscus.

Distribution 
This species occurs in the following countries and islands:
 Northern Mexico.
Great Lakes region.
Great Britain as a "hot-house alien"

References

Helicodiscidae
Fauna of the Great Lakes region (North America)
Molluscs of Mexico
Molluscs of the United States
Gastropods described in 1821